"3's & 7's" is the second single by Queens of the Stone Age from their 2007 album Era Vulgaris. It was released on June 4, 2007 and followed the digital download-only "Sick, Sick, Sick".
The single debuted at number one on the UK Rock & Metal Chart and number 19 on the UK Singles Chart.

Music video
A video for the song was shot in Joshua Tree and directed by Paul Minor, whose previous music promo work included "Starlight" by Muse. After a number of images were placed on photo-sharing website Flickr, the video in its entirety was added to iFilm on September 26, 2007, a full three months after the single's European release. The video itself is a trailer for a fake movie entitled "3's & 7's" and is shot in a similar style to the exploitation films of the 1960s and the 2007 film Grindhouse. Two versions of the video exist. The first version of the video contained full-frontal nudity. This version was then re-edited to remove all nudity, and the first version was then replaced with version two.

Track listings
CD
 "3's & 7's" – 3:34
 "Christian Brothers" – 4:25 (Elliott Smith cover)

7" - 1
A: "3's & 7's" – 3:34
B1: "Sick, Sick, Sick" – 3:34
B2: "I'm Designer – Remix" – 3:49

7" - 2
A: "3's & 7's" – 3:34
B1: "Sick, Sick, Sick" – 3:34
B2: "Goin' Out West" – 3:26 (Tom Waits cover)

Other versions
There are two other versions of this song.
 "3's & 7's" - 3:37 (Pre-Version)
 "3's & 7's" - 3:17 (Radio Edit)
The pre-version of the song that was uploaded to the band's Myspace page features different vocal notes during the first half of the bridge, and different lyrics in the second half.

The lyrics that appear in the Era Vulgaris version are:

And the pre-version's lyrics are:

Personnel
 Josh Homme – vocals, lead guitar, bass, electric piano
 Troy Van Leeuwen – rhythm guitar, lap steel guitar
 Joey Castillo – drums

Charts

References

External links

Queens of the Stone Age songs
2007 singles
Songs written by Josh Homme
Songs written by Joey Castillo
Songs written by Troy Van Leeuwen
Interscope Records singles